Muhammadu Adamu Fegen Gawo (1954 – 31 December 2019) was a Nigerian politician.

Gawo was elected to the Jigawa State House of Assembly in 2015. He represented the Garki/Babura constituency, and was affiliated with the All Progressives Congress.

Death 
Gawo died on 31 December 2019, aged 65, while seeking medical treatment in Dubai.

References

1954 births
2019 deaths
21st-century Nigerian politicians
Jigawa State politicians
All Progressives Congress politicians